Live in Chicago is a live by the American rock band Ween, released in 2004. It is the band's fifth live album, and the second album overall that they released on Sanctuary Records. The album's performance took place at The Vic Theatre in Chicago, Illinois, USA.

Packaged alternately as a CD with bonus DVD or a DVD with bonus CD, Live in Chicago documents two nights of a show the group did in Chicago in support of their album Quebec. The DVD features a wide variety of Ween songs, covering nearly every Ween album except 12 Golden Country Greats and even features a cover of the Led Zeppelin classic "All My Love". Also, the DVD contains alternate camera angles for three of the performances, and a bonus music video for the song "Transdermal Celebration".

The CD, in comparison, contains fewer songs and a different track list.

Track listing (DVD)
All songs written by Ween, except "All My Love" by John Paul Jones and Robert Plant.

Track listing (CD)

References

External links 
 

2004 live albums
2004 video albums
Live video albums
Ween live albums
Ween video albums
Sanctuary Records live albums
Sanctuary Records video albums